Suilven is a mountain in Scotland. Lying in a remote area in the west of Sutherland, it rises from a wilderness landscape of moorland, bogs, and lochans known as Inverpolly National Nature Reserve. The highest point, Caisteal Liath ("Grey Castle" in Scottish Gaelic), lies at the northwest end of this ridge.

Geology

Geologically, Suilven is formed of Torridonian sandstone, sitting on a landscape of Lewisian gneiss. The surrounding rocks were eroded during an episode of glaciation. Suilven was covered by the last British and Irish Ice Sheet. Prior research described Suilven and many other mountains in Northwest Scotland as nunataks, but cosmogenic isotope dating of mountaintop erratics has since disproved this hypothesis. The flow of ice created the distinctive narrow teardrop plan, while carving and scouring the vertical sides of the mountain.

Management

In 2005 Glencanisp estate, of which Suilven forms part and the neighbouring Drumrunie estate, were bought by the local community with the help of the John Muir Trust. The Assynt Foundation aims to create local employment and safeguard the natural and cultural heritage for the benefit of the community and future generations, and for the enjoyment of the wider public.

Ascent

The final pull up to the bealach is steep, and the path has been re-made with many boulder steps. From here the summit is nearby. The summit itself is broad and grassy, though it is almost totally surrounded by vertical cliffs.

One may also start from Elphin, on the eastern side. It is possible to reach the ridge without first climbing to Bealach Mòr from this direction, though very exposed scrambling is required, particularly between Meall Meadhonach and Meall Beag.

In popular culture
In the 2017 British film Edie, a widowed pensioner climbs Suilven to complete a long-held ambition.

See also 
 Stac Pollaidh
 Canisp
 List of inselbergs

References

External links

 Computer generated summit panoramas North South index
 Assynt Foundation

Grahams
Marilyns of Scotland
Mountains and hills of the Northwest Highlands
Inselbergs of Europe